Aten is the disk of the sun in ancient Egyptian mythology.

Aten may also refer to:

 Aten (city), an ancient city found near Luxor, Egypt
 Aten, Nebraska, a community in Cedar County
 Aten asteroids, a group of near-Earth asteroids
 Aten religion or Atenism, associated with the ancient Egyptian pharaoh Akhenaten
 ATEN International, a Taiwanese technology company
 Aten language, spoken in Nigeria
 Atén River, a river of Bolivia
 2062 Aten, an asteroid and namesake of an asteroid group

People named Aten
 Erhart Aten (1932–2004), Micronesian politician
 Ira Aten (1862–1953), Texas Ranger
 Jan Willem Aten, (born 1953), Brazilian yachtsman
 Murl K. Aten (1901–1971), American politician